Lee Jae-han (born 1971), also known as John H. Lee, is a South Korean film director and screenwriter. Lee studied filmmaking at New York University. Although making films of different genres each time, his directing talent, chic and sensuous, runs through all his works. Since his debut in 2000, he has made several box office successes such as A Moment to Remember (2004), Sayonara Itsuka (2010), 71: Into the Fire (2010) and Operation Chromite (2016).

Filmography 
The Cut Runs Deep (2000) - director, screenwriter, editor 
History of BoA 2000–2002 (video, 2003) - director 
A Moment to Remember (2004) - director, screenwriter
Sayonara Itsuka (Saying Good-bye, Oneday) (2010) - director, screenwriter
71: Into the Fire (2010) - director, screenwriter
The Third Way of Love (2015) - director
Operation Chromite (2016) - director
Jaejoong: On the Road (2021) - director

References

External links 
 
 
 

1971 births
Living people
South Korean film directors
South Korean screenwriters
New York University alumni